Abdullahabad may refer to:
Abdolabad (disambiguation)
Abdollahabad (disambiguation)